1992 Yokohama Marinos season

Team name
Club nameNissan F.C. Yokohama Marinos
NicknameYokohama Marinos

Review and events

Competitions

Domestic results

Emperor's Cup

J.League Cup

International results

Asian Cup Winners' Cup

Player statistics

Transfers

In:

Out:

Nissan farm is second team of Nissan FC (Yokohama Marinos).

Transfers during the season

In
none

Out
none

References

Other pages
 J. League official site
 Yokohama F. Marinos official site

Yokohama Marinos
Yokohama F. Marinos seasons